Alexander Berzin (born 1944) is a scholar, translator, and teacher of Tibetan Buddhism.

Early years
Berzin was born in Paterson, New Jersey, United States. He received his B.A. degree in 1965 from the Department of Oriental Studies, Rutgers University; his M.A. in 1967; and, his Ph.D. in 1972 from the Departments of Far Eastern Languages (Chinese) and Sanskrit and Indian Studies, Harvard University.

Work
His main teacher was Tsenzhab Serkong Rinpoche, an assistant tutor of the Dalai Lama. Berzin served as the Dalai Lama's archivist and occasionally his interpreter.
	
In 1998, Berzin moved back to the West and devotes most of his time to preparing his unpublished materials for his Study Buddhism website. The website was chosen in 2011 to be archived as part of the Bodleian Electronic Archives and Manuscripts collection of the University of Oxford.

Berzin is on the Board of Advisors of Tibet House Germany and the International Center for Buddhist-Muslim Understanding of the College of Religious Studies of Mahidol University, Thailand.

Berzin is the founder and contributing author of Studybuddhism.com, a website containing information on Buddhism, Buddhist texts, Tibetan culture, and other relevant subjects.

He currently lives in Berlin, Germany.

Bibliography
 (Co-editor with John Bray) Kuleshov, Nikolai S. Russia’s Tibet File. Dharamsala: Library of Tibetan Works and Archives, 1996. .
 (Coauthor with the 14th Dalai Lama, Translator, and Editor), The Gelug/Kagyu Tradition of Mahamudra. Ithaca, Snow Lion, 1997. .
 Taking the Kalachakra Initiation. Ithaca: Snow Lion, 1997. . Reprinted as Introduction to the Kalachakra Initiation. Ithaca: Snow Lion, 2010. .
 Developing Balanced Sensitivity. Ithaca: Snow Lion, 1998. .
 Kalachakra and Other Six-Session Yoga Texts. Ithaca: Snow Lion, 1998. .
 Relating to a Spiritual Teacher: Building a Healthy Relationship. Ithaca, Snow Lion, 2000. . Reprinted as Wise Teacher, Wise Student: Tibetan Approaches to a Healthy Relationship. Ithaca: Snow Lion, 2012.<ref>Tatz, Mark (2002). [https://www.jstor.org/stable/43301920 Review of Relating to a Spiritual Teacher: Building a Healthy Relationship]. Tibet Journal 27 (3-4), Autumn and Winter 2002. </ref>
 "A Buddhist View of Islam" in Islam and Interfaith Relations: The Gerald Weisfeld Lectures 2006'' (Perry Schmidt-Leukel and Lloyd Ridgeon, eds.). London: SCM Press, 2007, 187–203. .
 "The Sources of Happiness According to Buddhism" in Glück (Andre Holenstein, Ruth Meyer Schweizer, Pasqualina Perrig-Chiello, Peter Rusterholz, Christian von Zimmermann, Andreas Wagner, Sara Margarita Zwahlen, eds.). Bern, Stuttgart, Wien, Haupt Verlag, 2011, 41–52. .

References

External links
 Profile at StudyBuddhism

1944 births
Living people
American Buddhists
American former Christians
American educators
American translators
American male writers
Buddhist translators
Tibetan Buddhism writers
Writers from Paterson, New Jersey
Tibetan Buddhists from the United States
Tibetan Buddhist spiritual teachers
Rutgers University alumni
Harvard Graduate School of Arts and Sciences alumni
Tibetologists
American scholars of Buddhism